The 2012 Supercopa Argentina Final was the 1st edition of the Supercopa, an annual football match contested by the winners of the previous season's Argentine Primera División and Copa Argentina competitions. 

The match was held in the Estadio Bicentenario of Catamarca, where Arsenal de Sarandí beat Boca Juniors via penalty shoot-out, winning their first Supercopa title.

Qualified teams

Match details

References

2012–13 in Argentine football
Supercopa Argentina
Supercopa Argentina 2012
Supercopa Argentina 2012